Melicytus novae-zelandiae  subsp.  centurionis is a flowering plant in the family Violaceae. It is a subspecies of Melicytus novae-zelandiae, known in New Zealand as coastal mahoe. The subspecific epithet honours the military Captain James Doran McComish (1881–1948), who made several visits in the 1930s to collect plants on Lord Howe Island.

Description
It is a shrub or small tree growing to 5 m in height. The chartaceous (papery), glabrous, oval leaves are 40–70 mm long, 15–27 mm wide. Clusters of small greenish yellow flowers, 2 mm long, appear from August to October. The round, purple fruits are 6 mm in diameter.

Distribution and habitat
The subspecies is endemic to Australia’s subtropical Lord Howe Island in the Tasman Sea. There it is rare, occurring in forest at intermediate elevations.

References

novae-zelandiae subsp. centurionis
Endemic flora of Lord Howe Island
Plants described in 1970
Malpighiales of Australia
Plant subspecies